Anabel Medina Garrigues was the 2-time defending champion and successfully defended her title, by defeating Tathiana Garbin 6–4, 6–4 in the final.

Seeds

Draw

Finals

Top half

Bottom half

References

External links
 Official results archive (ITF)
 Official results archive (WTA)

Internazionali Femminili di Palermo - Singles
2006 Singles